Rudy Carpenter (born April 15, 1986) is a former professional gridiron football quarterback. He was signed by the Dallas Cowboys as an undrafted free agent in 2009. He played college football at Arizona State.

Early years

Carpenter led Westlake High School to a 14-0 record and the 2003 California Interscholastic Federation Division II championship. Carpenter was named the Los Angeles Daily News Offensive Player of the Year. He was also given a pre and postseason All-America selection by Prepstar Magazine. Carpenter was listed as the No. 67 player in California by SuperPrep Magazine and listed as the No. 36 player in California and a preseason All-American by SuperPrep Magazine. He was rated as the No. 20 quarterback in the nation by Rivals.com. He played in the Cali-Florida High School All-Star game. His statistics as a senior included 2,705 passing yards (163 completions on 262 attempts) and 36 touchdowns and only six interceptions, and he also rushed for 626 yards and seven scores and led Westlake to a Division IV Championship and a 14-0 season.

College career

2005
Carpenter started the final five games of his freshman season. During that time he was the most efficient quarterback in the country and led the Sun Devils to a victory over Rutgers in the Insight Bowl. The following fall, Sam Keller, whose injury allowed Carpenter to become the starter in 2005, was named the starting quarterback by then-ASU coach Dirk Koetter. But two days later, Koetter reversed his decision and Carpenter was given the starting job. Keller subsequently transferred to Nebraska and Carpenter went on to have a less than desired season. In 2005, Carpenter earned second-team Freshman All-America honors by Scout.com and was named an honorable mention Freshman All-American by Sporting News.

2006
Carpenter earned honorable mention All-Pac-10 honors in his first full season as the Sun Devils starting quarterback. Carpenter completed 184-of-332 passes for 2,523 yards and 23 touchdowns and finished third in the Pac-10 Conference in touchdown passes as well as grossing 296 rushing yards (69 net yards). Carpenter completed 17-of-24 passes for 261 yards and two touchdowns against Northern Arizona and threw a career-high five touchdowns against Nevada to go along with 333 yards on 17-of-26 passing. He totaled 248 passing yards and a pair of touchdowns on 21-of-37 passes at Colorado and threw for 177 yards and two scores at California. Carpenter attempted 75 passes over the course of five midseason games without an interception. He ended the season tallying 183 yards of total offense at USC, including a career-high 49 net rushing yards, one of which was a game-high sprint of 38 yards. Carpenter completed 14-of-15 passes against Stanford (93.3 pct.).

2007
In 2007, Carpenter led the Sun Devils in the passer completion rating, compiling a 68.4% completion average. Carpenter started in all 13 games, and made a bowl appearance in the 2007 Holiday Bowl against Texas.

2008
Carpenter entered the season with 31 consecutive starts, the most out of any ASU Quarterback since Jake Plummer. Against the California Golden Bears on October 4, Carpenter finished with 165 yards passing, including one touchdown pass and two interceptions. He injured his ankle in the final minutes and had to leave the game on crutches. The loss marked the Sun Devils' first three-game losing streak since Dennis Erickson's tenure as head coach. ASU lost their final game to Arizona in the Territorial Cup rivalry, giving Carpenter a loss in his final game and ending a three-year streak of Territorial Cup victories by ASU.

Professional career

Dallas Cowboys
Carpenter was signed as an undrafted free agent by the Dallas Cowboys a day after the 2009 NFL Draft. He was waived on September 5, 2009 and subsequently re-signed to the practice squad the following day.

Tampa Bay Buccaneers
Carpenter was signed off the Cowboys practice squad by the Tampa Bay Buccaneers on November 23, 2009. In November 2010, Carpenter was moved to the active roster of Tampa Bay as the third-string quarterback. Following the completion of the 2010 season, he became an exclusive rights free agent. Carpenter re-signed with the Buccaneers on July 29. He was waived during final cuts on September 3, 2011, and re-signed to the Buccaneers' practice squad two days later. With an injury to Bucs starter Josh Freeman, Carpenter was placed on the active roster for the December 4 game against the Carolina Panthers. He made his first NFL game appearance in the game for one snap after Freeman's replacement Josh Johnson was shaken up on a play.

Dallas Cowboys
Carpenter was claimed off of waivers by the Dallas Cowboys April 5, 2012.
On August 20, 2012, Carpenter tweeted via his Twitter account @rudygcarp12: "Thankful for the opportunity Dallas its been great!," signifying he was being cut again.

Carpenter was reported as flying to Kansas City to work out with the Kansas City Chiefs January 20, 2013.
Carpenter tweeted: "Flying to Kansas City on Thursday for a workout! Just happy and thankful to maybe gettin back in!"

BC Lions

Carpenter signed with the BC Lions of the CFL on April 9, 2013. He would be competing for the backup role in the organization with two-year starter Travis Lulay having a solid hold as the starting quarterback. However, he was later released on April 30, 2013 following the club's signing of Chris Hart.

See also
 List of NCAA Division I FBS quarterbacks with at least 10,000 career passing yards
 List of NCAA major college football yearly passing leaders

References

External links
 Official Website
 Tampa Bay Buccaneers bio
 Arizona State Sun Devils bio

1986 births
Living people
People from Westlake Village, California
Players of American football from California
American football quarterbacks
Arizona State Sun Devils football players
Dallas Cowboys players
Tampa Bay Buccaneers players
Sportspeople from Ventura County, California